Naftokhimik Kalush (Ukrainian: "Нафтохімік" Калуш) was a Ukrainian professional women's football club from Kalush, Ukraine. They played in dark blue shirts and dark blue shorts at home and when they are away they play in white shirts and white shorts.

History
It was founded in April 2004 and as a women team of FC Spartak Ivano-Frankivsk, while competing out of Kalush. Spartak has already merged its opertions with the local FC Kalush which became its farm club. In 2006 Spartak Ivano-Frankivsk lost its sponsors (Russian Lukoil) and stopped supporting its women team. The team went through reorganization and reestablished as an independent football club Naftokhimik Kalush.

In the 2007 season they have won their first Championship. In the 2008-09 they played in the UEFA Women's Cup. In beginning 2009 the club suffered financial difficulties, went into bankruptcy and folded.

In 2011 it reappeared in the Ukrainian League

Honours 
Top Division
 Winners (1):  2007

European History

References

External links
  Unofficial website

 
FC Spartak Ivano-Frankivsk
Association football clubs established in 2004
Association football clubs disestablished in 2009
2004 establishments in Ukraine
2009 disestablishments in Ukraine
Football clubs in Kalush, Ukraine
Ukrainian Women's League clubs
Defunct women's football clubs in Ukraine